Alex Cuthbertson (born 10 June 1931) is a former Australian rules footballer who played for the St Kilda Football Club in the Victorian Football League (VFL).

Notes

External links 

Living people
1931 births
Australian rules footballers from Victoria (Australia)
St Kilda Football Club players